Perforate leaves, sometimes called fenestrate, occur naturally in some species of plants. Holes develop as a leaf grows.

The size, shape, and quantity of holes in each leaf can vary greatly depending on the species and can even vary greatly within a given species. Perforation is caused by sections of leaf ceasing cell growth or by dying during an early stage in the development of the leaf. These deformations that are created earliest in the leaf development end up looking more like slashes whereas those that develop later end up looking more like holes. This trait is found in only one species in Aponogetonaceae, Aponogeton madagascariensis (Madagascar laceleaf), and a few genera in Araceae, particularly Monstera.

It is not fully known what evolutionary purpose perforation serves, but there are several possibilities. Perforation could serve the purpose of reducing the variations in growth rate, minimize chances of leaves tearing in high winds or it could help to maximize the amount of rain that's able to reach the plant's roots. It could also help to cool the plant by producing turbulence around the leaf. Another possibility is that perforation is a defense against herbivory. The holes might make the leaf look less enticing to herbivores. This, however, is unlikely in relation to hemiepiphytic aroids, which often displays this trait, due to the tendency of juvenile leaves not being perforated.

See also
 Leaf window, leaves have translucent areas rather than holes.

References

Further reading
Bown, Deni (2000). Aroids: Plants of the Arum Family [ILLUSTRATED]. Timber Press. 

Leaves
Plant morphology
Plant anatomy